José Antonio Gutierrez (born Guatemala City, Guatemala 1 December 1980 – died Umm Qasr, Iraq 21 March 2003) was a US Marine Lance Corporal  and the first US Marine killed in action in the Iraq War.

Gutierrez and his sister were orphaned in Guatemala City in the mid 1980s. He was taken into the Casa Alianza residential care program, where he also attended school, earning high marks. By 1992 he had joined his sister Engracia with a family in Chinautla, Guatemala. In 1997 Gutierrez crossed illegally into the United States, was detained by the Immigration and Naturalization Service, then received asylum and was placed with a foster family in Lomita, California. He entered high school and then completed college over the next few years.

Gutierrez joined the Marine Corps on March 25, 2002. After basic training, he was assigned to 2nd Battalion, 1st Marine Regiment, 1st Marine Division. The Division was dispatched to the Middle East, and the 2nd Battalion was attached to the 15th Marine Expeditionary Unit for the opening ground offensive of the Iraq Warthe Battle of Umm Qasr. In the opening of the Battle, on March 21, 2003, Gutierrez became the first US Marine killed in action. His body was returned to Guatemala City for burial.

His life and death are the basis for the documentary film The Short Life of José Antonio Gutierrez.

David Emanuel Hickman, of the U.S. Army's 82nd Airborne Division, was the last US service member killed in the Iraq War. He died on November 14, 2011, eight years and eight months after Gutierrez was killed.

References

External links
 

United States Marines
1980 births
2003 deaths
United States Marine Corps personnel of the Iraq War
American military personnel killed in the Iraq War